Trần Bảo Toàn (born 14 July 2000) is a Vietnamese footballer who is a midfielder for V-League (Vietnam) club Hoàng Anh Gia Lai and the Vietnam national under-23 football team.

International career

Vietnam U–19
In 2018, he was summoned by coach Hoang Anh Tuan to Vietnam U19 to attend the 2018 AFF U-19 Youth Championship in Indonesia. Bao Toan was then called up to the International U19 Championship in Qatar and then the 2018 AFC U-19 Championship.

Vietnam U–23
At the 2022 AFF U-23 Championship, Bao Toan was in the "reinforcement group" added to the team after a series of players of the team received positive results for COVID-19. The guy and 3 other teammates even had to travel overland through Cambodia by bus. Bao Toan scored the only goal to help U23 Vietnam beat Thailand U23 in the final to win the championship.

International goals

Vietnam U19

U-23

Honours
Vietnam U23
AFF U-23 Championship: 2022

External links

References

2000 births
Living people
Vietnamese footballers
V.League 1 players
Hoang Anh Gia Lai FC players
Vietnam international footballers
People from Quảng Ngãi province
Association football central defenders